Puzzle Mountain is a mountain located in Oxford County, Maine, and is one of the easternmost mountains in the Mahoosuc Range. The mountain also has a false peak to the north-northwest of the true summit, known as Little Puzzle Mountain. Puzzle Mountain is in the watershed of the Androscoggin River.

Trails
The summit of the mountain can be accessed from the southern trail head of the Grafton Loop Trail. The initial miles of the trail have a relatively low incline and utilize old logging roads for switchbacks. At about two miles, the trail makes a sharp turn to the left, and begins to climb at a steeper grade. At about 2.4 miles, the trail reaches exposed granite boulders and ledges, with views of the Sunday River Ski Area, Grafton Notch, and the distant Presidentials. The summit of Puzzle Mountain is at 3.2 miles, and provides views in all directions, as far as Sugarloaf Mountain. The total distance to the summit of Puzzle Mountain is 3.2 miles, and takes approximately three hours and thirty minutes to summit.

As of September, 2009, a trail nicknamed the "Loopette Trail" was approaching completion. It is being built to go to the various false peaks of the mountain that were previously unreachable. Its mileage and layout are currently unknown, as well as whether or not it will be considered part of the Grafton Loop Trail.

June 2022: The Woodsum Loop, which does feed into the Grafton Loop Trail (not sure if it's "part of" it), is complete. The mileage is 2.5 miles, parking lot to the start of the loop, then the 2.6-mile loop, then 2.5 miles back to parking lot. (This encompasses both peaks.)

See also
List of mountains in Maine

References

Mountains of Oxford County, Maine
Mountains of Maine